Tsvetan Tsvetkov (born 23 January 1954) is a Bulgarian boxer. He competed in the men's lightweight event at the 1976 Summer Olympics.

References

1954 births
Living people
Bulgarian male boxers
Olympic boxers of Bulgaria
Boxers at the 1976 Summer Olympics
Place of birth missing (living people)
Lightweight boxers